, known simply as Castle in the Sky in North America, is a 1986 Japanese animated fantasy adventure film written and directed by Hayao Miyazaki. It is the first film by Studio Ghibli, produced for Tokuma Shoten and distributed by the Toei Company. Set in a fictional late 19th century, it follows the adventures of a boy and girl who are trying to keep a powerful crystal from the army, a group of secret agents, and a family of pirates, while searching for a legendary floating castle.

The film won the Animage Anime Grand Prix in 1986. In Japanese polls asking about the greatest animations, it was voted the second-best animated film at the 2006 Japan Media Arts Festival and was voted first place in a 2008 Oricon audience poll. Laputa has had a strong influence on Japanese popular culture, and has inspired numerous films, media and games, in Japan and internationally. It has been cited as an influential classic in the steampunk and dieselpunk genres. Films set in the 20th century

Plot summary 

An airship carrying Sheeta — an orphan girl abducted by government agent Muska — is attacked by Dola and her air pirate sons, seeking Sheeta's blue crystal amulet. While attempting to escape, Sheeta slips off the airship and falls unconscious. However, the amulet, emanating a mysterious blue light, catches her and lowers her slowly to the ground. An orphan boy named Pazu catches her and takes her to his home in a mining town. Pazu shows her a picture of a legendary floating city, Laputa, taken by his late father.

When Dola's pirates and Muska's men appear and pursue them, Pazu and Sheeta, aided by the amulet, fall into an abandoned mine, where she tells of how she was kidnapped from her mountain home by Muska and his agents. In the caverns, they meet the old miner Uncle Pom, who shows them the glowing deposits of Aetherium around them.

Leaving the mines, Sheeta tells Pazu her full name — Lucita Toel Ul Laputa — revealing her as a descendant of the Laputan royal family. Muska captures them and takes them to his fortress where the children are imprisoned. Muska shows Sheeta a broken Laputan robot; knowing her name, he intends to make her reveal Laputa's location. Muska threatens Pazu, and for his own safety, Sheeta orders him to go back home. A despondent Pazu returns, where Dola and her sons await and capture him. To rescue Sheeta, Pazu joins them on their quest to find Laputa.

Sheeta recites a spell her grandmother taught her, unintentionally activating the amulet and the robot, which wreaks havoc until it is destroyed by the military's huge airship, Goliath. Pazu rescues Sheeta, but Muska obtains the amulet, which now emits a beam of light in the direction of Laputa. Pazu, Sheeta, and the pirates return to their airship and pursue the Goliath, which is navigating by Sheeta's amulet. Along the way, Dola tells Pazu and Sheeta how to turn the lookout into a kite, giving them a higher vantage point. Pazu spots a swirl of clouds in an approaching hurricane. Recognizing the clouds from his father's stories, he tells Dola they have found Laputa and insists that they head toward the eye of the storm. However, the Goliath appears, damages the pirate ship and severs the lookout kite from it, sending Pazu and Sheeta into the clouds.

Sheeta and Pazu safely reach Laputa, where they find plants and animals thriving in the ruins of the castle, which surround a huge tree. However, the army plunders the city, with the pirates as their captives. Muska captures Sheeta while Pazu frees the pirates. Muska takes Sheeta into the center of Laputa, a vast repository of scientific knowledge where an immense crystal powers the city. Muska reveals his real name — Romuska Palo Ul Laputa — another member of the royal line that left Laputa centuries ago. Using the amulet to access Laputan technology, he unleashes Laputa's secret weapon of mass destruction and a dormant robot army, destroys the Goliath and its crew, and declares his plans to conquer the world. Horrified, Sheeta takes the amulet back and flees. She gives the amulet to Pazu through a gap in the wall, but is cornered by a pursuing Muska in Laputa's throne room.

Sheeta rebukes Muska, declaring the people of Laputa left because they realized humankind was meant to live on Earth. Undaunted, Muska threatens to kill her unless she gives him the amulet. Pazu arrives and asks to speak with her, and Muska grants them one minute. Sheeta and Pazu recite a spell of destruction connected to the crystal, causing the center of Laputa to collapse. The resulting flash of light blinds Muska, who falls to his death offscreen, while the children are protected by the tree roots. The remainder of Laputa's ruins ascend until they disappear from view, supported by its crystal. Pazu and Sheeta take the kite to reunite with the pirates before both groups part ways.

During the closing credits sequence, Laputa is shown floating in orbit above Earth.

Voice cast

Development

Precursors to Studio Ghibli 

Miyazaki's earlier anime series Future Boy Conan (1978) featured a number of elements that he later adapted for Laputa. Conan and Lana, for example, were forerunners of Pazu and Sheeta, and it had similarities to Sheeta's rescue by Pazu. Some of the characters and themes in Future Boy Conan set the blueprint for Laputa. The name "Laputa" is derived from Jonathan Swift's novel Gulliver's Travels, wherein Swift's Laputa is also a flying island propelled by a giant central crystal and controlled by its citizens. Anthony Lioi feels that Miyazaki's Laputa is similar to Swift's Laputa, where the technological superiority of the castle in the sky is used for political ends.

Trip to Wales 

Some of the architecture seen in the film was inspired by a Welsh mining town. Miyazaki first visited Wales in 1984 and witnessed the miners' strike firsthand. He returned to the country in 1986 to prepare for Laputa, which he said reflected his Welsh experience: "I was in Wales just after the miners' strike. I really admired the way the miners' unions fought to the very end for their jobs and communities, and I wanted to reflect the strength of those communities in my film." Miyazaki told The Guardian, "I admired those men, I admired the way they battled to save their way of life, just as the coal miners in Japan did. Many people of my generation see the miners as a symbol; a dying breed of fighting men. Now they are gone."

Animation 

Telecom Animation Film, and Oh! Production helped animate the film.

Release

Box office 

The film was released in Japan on August 2, 1986, by the Toei Company, which also released Nausicaä of the Valley of the Wind. 

In the United Kingdom, the film's 2012 release grossed $327,559 in its first week. In the United States, the film's 2018 limited release grossed $523,664. In other territories, the film's 2003 release grossed $5,434,627, including $4,670,084 in France alone.

In terms of box office admissions, the film sold about 800,000 tickets in Japan and 1,066,427 tickets in Europe.

Home media

By 2003, Laputa had sold 1.612million VHS and DVD units in Japan.

In the United Kingdom, it was 2019's eighth best-selling foreign language film on home video (below six other Japanese films, including five Miyazaki anime films).

English dubs 

The first English dub of Laputa was produced by an unknown party commissioned by Tokuma Shoten for viewing on international flights on Japan Airlines; this dub was licensed between 1989 and 1991 by the then-brand-new Streamline Pictures for distribution in North American markets. Carl Macek, the head of Streamline, was disappointed with this dub, deeming it "adequate, but clumsy". Following this, Tokuma allowed Streamline to dub their future acquisitions My Neighbor Totoro and Kiki's Delivery Service. In UK, the premiere took place on August 12, 1987 on MTV Europe in its own dubbing. The original dub of Laputa is also seen on the 1996 Ghibli ga Ippai Laserdisc set, and on the first Japanese DVD release. The initial Japanese DVD release is now out of print and the subsequent re-release in 2014 replaces it with the Disney dubbed version.

The English dub produced by Disney was recorded in 1998 and planned for release on video in 1999, but the release was cancelled after Princess Mononoke did not fare as well in the US, and so Laputa's release date was pushed back yet again; on occasion the completed dub was screened at select children's festivals. The film was finally released on DVD and video in the US on April 15, 2003, alongside a rerelease of Kiki's Delivery Service and Spirited Away. As with Mononoke and Kiki, critical opinion was mixed about the new dub, but Cloris Leachman and Mark Hamill's performances as Dola and Muska drew praise. Laputa was reissued on American home video on March 2, 2010, as a tribute accompanying the home video release of Ponyo. The film was released by Buena Vista on Blu-ray in North America on May 22, 2012, alongside Whisper of the Heart and The Secret World of Arrietty. Shout! Factory and GKIDS re-issued the film on Blu-ray and DVD on October 31, 2017.

Differences between versions 

Although the plot and much of the script was left intact, Disney's English dub of Laputa contains some changes:

 A significant amount of background chatter as well as one-liners were added (even more so than in Disney's dub of Kiki's Delivery Service), filling in moments of silence and increasing the frenetic effect of certain scenes.
 Composer Joe Hisaishi was commissioned to rework and extend his original 60-minute electronic–orchestral score into a 90-minute symphonic orchestral score, to make the film more palatable to American audiences. The sound mix received a vast overhaul as well. 
 Pazu and Sheeta, voiced by James Van Der Beek and Anna Paquin, respectively, are made to sound several years older, placing them in their mid-teens rather than their pre-teens.
 Several modifications were made to the Dola gang's dialogue regarding Sheeta, including a declaration of love by one of the pirates. In the original Japanese version, the dialogue presented Sheeta as a potential mother figure to the pirates, rather than a potential romantic interest.
 References to Robert Louis Stevenson's Treasure Island and Jonathan Swift's Gulliver's Travels were removed, the latter of which had also been removed from the original dub.

Although all these alterations were approved by Studio Ghibli and Miyazaki, some critics have called them into question. Regarding the soundtrack, Miyazaki himself is said to have approved of Hisaishi's reworking; his compliments were echoed by several reviewers.

The 2010 DVD rerelease reverts some of these changes. The updated score and sound mix are replaced by the originals in the Japanese-language audio, retaining the updates in the dub. Some of the added dialogue is removed in the dub, restoring silence where it is in the original Japanese version. However, the English subtitles are not updated to reflect the trimmed dialogue, which sometimes results in text being displayed when no characters are speaking. These changes are also seen in the 2012 US Blu-ray release. For the Japanese, Australian, and British Blu-rays, the updated score is used, and the subtitles are properly timed, literal translations from the original Japanese, rather than the improperly timed dubtitles.

The 2017 Blu-ray rerelease by GKIDS, besides offering the original Japanese, features the 2010 edit of the English dub but presents the option of playing it with either the original or the new score. For subtitles, the correctly translated from Japanese to English subtitles are added. The HBO Max release of the English dub only uses the original score. In the film's release on Netflix, the Japanese audio features the original audio mix and score, while the English audio features the updated audio mix and score. Subtitles are only available for the original Japanese audio.

Title 

The name "Laputa" comes from Jonathan Swift's Gulliver's Travels. Certain English- and Spanish-language releases have opted to omit the name "Laputa" due to it resembling "la puta" ( "the whore") in Spanish.

In 2003, the film's title was shortened to Castle in the Sky in several countries, including the United States, United Kingdom, Mexico, and Spain. In Spain the castle was named Lapuntu in the first dub in 2003, although in the second one made in 2010 retains the original name Laputa. In the Catalan dub in 2012, the meaning of Laputa was said with the tonic syllable in "La".

The film's full title was later restored in Britain, in February 2006, when Optimum Asia – a division of London-based Optimum Releasing (StudioCanal UK since 2011) – acquired the UK distribution rights to the Studio Ghibli collection from Buena Vista Home Entertainment.

Additionally, during the late 1980s and early 1990s, the pre-Disney dub was screened in the UK as an art-house film, under the alternative title Laputa: The Flying Island. It also aired at least twice on British television, but with some scenes cut.

Music 

Just as with Nausicaä, Joe Hisaishi composed the soundtrack of Laputa. Miyazaki and Hisaishi went on to become close collaborators, and Hisaishi has since provided the music for all of Miyazaki's feature films. Three months before the film's theatrical release, the image album — a collection of demos and musical sketches that serve as a precursor to the finished score — was published by Tokuma on compact disc. A third version of the soundtrack, rearranged for full symphony orchestra and recorded by the Tokyo City Philharmonic,  released in 1987 on compact disc.

For the second English dub produced by Disney, Hisaishi was called upon to rewrite the soundtrack to be more suitable for audiences in America. The new soundtrack was recorded by the Seattle Symphony and first featured in the 2003 North American home media release.

The credits sequence features an original vocal song titled Carrying You performed by Azumi Inoue, with music by Hisaishi and lyrics by Miyazaki. The song was released in 1988 as a compact disc single, featuring an additional chorus version performed by the Suginami Children's Choir.

Themes and style

Innovations in steampunk 

Jeff VanderMeer and S.J. Chambers, in The Steampunk Bible, consider the film a milestone in the steampunk genre, calling it "one of the first modern steampunk classics." Archetypal steampunk elements in Laputa include airships, air pirates, steam-powered robots, and a view of steam power as a limitless but potentially dangerous source of power. Philip Boyes of Eurogamer also considers it an influential work in the dieselpunk genre.

Connections to ancient mythology 

Miyazaki, through the dialog of Colonel Muska, credited Laputa as having informed Biblical and Hindu legends—thus tying the world of Laputa to the real Earth (including Western and Eastern civilizations)—as do Miyazaki's choices of the medieval castle architecture on the ground; the Gothic and half-timbered buildings in the village near the fort; the Welsh mining-town architecture, clothing, and ground vehicles of Pazu's homeland; and the Victorian ambiance of the pirate ship. The film also features the use of ancient Babylonian cuneiform script on Laputa's interactive panels and tombstones; and makes references to the Hindu epic Ramayana, including "Indra's arrow", while the name Sheeta may be related to Sita, the protagonist of the Ramayana. The flying city of Laputa has an architectural design resembling the ancient Mesopotamian city of Babylon, including ziggurat-like structures, and with murals resembling ancient Egyptian and Assyrian art.

Reception

Critical responses 

According to the review aggregator website Rotten Tomatoes, 96% of critics have given the film a positive review based on 26 reviews, with an average rating of 7.5/10. The site's critics consensus reads, "With a storytelling palette as rich and brilliant as its animation, Castle in the Sky thrillingly encapsulates Studio Ghibli's unique strengths." At Metacritic, the film has a weighted average score of 78 out of 100 based on 7 critics, indicating "generally favorable reviews".

In 2001, the Japanese magazine Animage ranked Laputa:Castle in the Sky 44th in their list of 100 Best Anime Productions of All Time. In a 2006 poll of 100 best animations of all time by Japan's Agency for Cultural Affairs conducted at the 2006 Japan Media Arts Festival, Laputa was the second highest-ranked animated film (after Nausicaä of the Valley of the Wind, and third highest-ranked animation overall on the list (below Neon Genesis Evangelion and Nausicaä). In a 2008 animation audience poll conducted by Oricon in Japan, Laputa was voted first place, above Nausicaä in second place. Andrew Osmond of All the Anime calls Laputa the "best steampunk film" of all time. The film was ranked at number 10 on the list of Greatest Japanese Animated Films of All Time by Japanese film magazine kinema Junpo in 2009.

Accolades 

 Ōfuji Noburō Award; Mainichi Film Award
 First Place; Pia Ten (Best Films of the Year)
 First Place; Japanese Movies; City Road
 First Place; Japanese Movies; Eiga Geijutsu (Movie Art)
 First Place; Japanese Films Best 10; Osaka Film Festival
 Eighth Place; Japanese Films; Kinema Junpo Best 10
 Second Place; Readers' Choice; Kinema Junpo Best 10
 Best Anime; 9th Anime Grand Prix
 Special Recommendation; The Central Committee for Children's Welfare
 Special Award (to Miyazaki & Takahata); Revival of Japanese Movies
 Best Design Award; Anime

Cultural legacy 

Laputa has had a strong impact on Japanese popular culture, with the "Laputa Effect" comparable to "a modern day monomyth for Japanese genre films and media." 

The most tweeted moment in the history of Twitter was during one airing of Laputa on Japanese TV on August 2, 2013, when fans tweeted the word "balus" at the exact time that it was said in an important moment of the movie. There was a global peak of 143,199 tweets in one second.

Laputa has also had an influence on popular music; the popular jazz-funk band Hiatus Kaiyote has a song called 'Laputa' and its lyrics directly reference the film. Another example of a song directly referencing the film is a song titled 'Laputa' by the indie rock band Panchiko.

Animation and manga 

The success of Laputa led to a wave of steampunk anime and manga. A notable example is the anime series Nadia: The Secret of Blue Water (1990). The success of Laputa inspired Hideaki Anno and Studio Gainax to create Nadia, their first hit production, loosely adapting elements from Twenty Thousand Leagues Under the Sea, with Captain Nemo making an appearance. In turn, Nadia was influential on later steampunk anime, such as Katsuhiro Otomo's film production Steamboy (2004). Other steampunk anime and manga followed in the wake of Laputa, including Miyazaki's own films Porco Rosso (1992) and Howl's Moving Castle (2004), Sega's anime series Sakura Wars (1997), Square Enix's manga and anime franchise Fullmetal Alchemist (2001), and the manga and anime series Elemental Gelade (2002).

Manga author Katsura Hoshino, known for the manga and anime series D.Gray-man, was fascinated by Laputa to the point where she decided to seek work as an animator when growing up, before she ended up writing manga. Anime filmmaker Yasuhiro Yoshiura described his film Patema Inverted (2013) as his venture into "the world of Laputa and the boy-meets-girl story". Anime filmmaker Makoto Shinkai, known for the hit anime films Your Name (2016) and Weathering With You (2019), cited Laputa as his favourite animation. The anime series No Game No Life (2014) references the film in episode five.

Laputa influenced a number of animated films from Disney and Pixar. For example, Disney films such as Atlantis: The Lost Empire (2001), and Pixar films such as WALL-E (2008) and Up (2009). The French animated film April and the Extraordinary World (2015) was also influenced by Laputa.

Video games

Laputa has influenced numerous video games, particularly Japanese video games, with its success leading to a wave of steampunk video games. Game designer Hironobu Sakaguchi cited Laputa as an inspiration behind his Final Fantasy video game series, particularly citing it as an influence on the series' airships. Sega AM2 game designer Yu Suzuki cited Laputa as his original inspiration behind the hit arcade game After Burner (1987). Steel Empire (1992), a shoot 'em up game originally released as Koutetsu Teikoku on the Sega Mega Drive console in Japan and considered to be the first steampunk video game, was inspired by Laputa, helping to propel steampunk into the video game market. This influenced Final Fantasy VI (1994), a Japanese role-playing game developed by Squaresoft, which had a considerable influence on later steampunk video games. Sega's video game franchise Sakura Wars (1996) also followed in the wake of Laputa.

Laputa also inspired a number of other video games, including the Mega Man Legends series (whose Japanese version, coincidentally, would feature voice acting by Mayumi Tanaka [Pazu] and Keiko Yokozawa [Sheeta] as Rock/Mega Man Volnutt and Roll Caskett, respectively), Zack & Wiki, and Japanese role-playing games such as the Lunar series, Valkyrie Profile (1999), Skies of Arcadia (2000), Steambot Chronicles (2005), and Dark Cloud 2 (2002). Laputa also influenced the first-person shooter BioShock Infinite (2013), and the airships in the Mario and Civilization franchises. It also inspired Mojang to add the Iron Golem mob to Minecraft.

Notes

References

External links
 
 
 
 
 Laputa: Castle in the Sky at Nausicaa.net
 
 天空の城ラピュタ (Tenkuu no Shiro Laputa) at the Japanese Movie Database (Japanese)

1980s children's animated films
1980s children's fantasy films
1986 fantasy films
1986 anime films
1986 films
Abandoned buildings and structures in fiction
Adventure anime and manga
Air pirates
Airships in fiction
Animated films about aviation
Animated films about friendship
Animated films about orphans
Anime with original screenplays
Dieselpunk films
Drama anime and manga
Japanese fantasy adventure films
Fictional fortifications
Films directed by Hayao Miyazaki
Films scored by Joe Hisaishi
Films set in castles
1980s Japanese-language films
Mecha anime and manga
Pirate films
Pirates in anime and manga
Japanese robot films
Romance anime and manga
Steampunk anime and manga
Steampunk films
Studio Ghibli animated films